Trezeguet or Trézéguet may refer to:

 David Trezeguet (born 1977), French footballer
 Trézéguet (Egyptian footballer) (born 1994), real name Mahmoud Hassan, Egyptian footballer
 Jorge Trezeguet (born 1951), Argentine footballer and father of David Trezeguet